Scottsville is an unincorporated community in Liberty Township, Pope County, Arkansas, United States. The community was named for the Scott family, and was named Rocky Point, The Level, and The Levey prior to Scottsville.

References

Unincorporated communities in Pope County, Arkansas
Unincorporated communities in Arkansas